"Underworld" is a song recorded by Barry Gibb. It was released in August 2006 on iTunes and later included on the film soundtrack of Arctic Tale. This track, with "Doctor Mann" was released August 2006 under 'Barry Gibb Alan' (Barry's full name is Barry Alan Crompton Gibb) both songs were played few months earlier on Barry's official website's 'Barry Gibb Radio' feature, the artist was later changed to 'Barry Gibb'.

It was written by Barry and Ashley Gibb in 2004, and recorded by Barry in August or September 2004 in Middle Ear Studios, Miami Beach, Florida, same session as "Doctor Mann" and the unreleased "Starcrossed Lovers" both songs were also written by Barry and Ashley Gibb and engineered by Brian Tench. The first CD released of "Underworld" was on the film soundtrack of Arctic Tale with songs by various artists including Brian Wilson and Aimee Mann. But this track is not featured on the film so its inclusion appears to be the result of a business deal.

Musician Steve Gibb contributed guitar on this track while Eero Turunen plays keyboards and programming.

Personnel
 Barry Gibb — vocals, guitar
 Steve Gibb — guitar
 Eero Turunen – keyboard, programming
 Brian Tench — engineer

References

Barry Gibb songs
Songs written by Barry Gibb
2006 singles
2006 songs
Dance-pop songs